Ingles Ferry is a historic tavern near the city of Radford in Pulaski County, Virginia, Virginia, United States.

William Ingles and his wife Mary Draper Ingles began developing a farm on the eastern side of the New River a few years after Mary's capture by Shawnee Indians and subsequent escape in 1755.  Around 1762, William obtained a license to operate a ferry at the site of the current tavern.

William Ingles was in charge of improving and maintaining the road leading to and from Ingles Ferry, known at the time as Ingle's Ferry Road or English Ferry Road. It later became a main thoroughfare and was part of as the Great Wagon Road, the Philadelphia Road, and the Wilderness Road. By 1780, William Ingles owned 907 acres and ten slaves, who ran his ferry, worked in his mills or in domestic capacities. Following William Ingles' death in 1782, his son Thomas Ingles took over the operation of Ingles Ferry. During the first few years of its existence, Indians frequently attacked the farm and ferry. Mary Draper Ingles died at Ingles Ferry in 1815.

Thomas Ingles, grandson of William and Mary Draper Ingles, built a bridge across the New River at Ingles Ferry in 1840. Although it was the first bridge across the river, it was destroyed during the Civil War.

The property is listed on the National Register of Historic Places and the Virginia Landmarks Register.

See also
Ingles Bottom Archeological Sites

Bibliography
 Fitzpatrick, Francis Burke. History of Ingles Ferry - 1937. Washington, District of Columbia: Library of Congress Photoduplication Service, 1990. Notes:	Microfilm of original typescript (1937, carbon or mimeograph, 65 leaves). Contains history of Ingles Ferry and settlement and biographical sketches of Colonel William Ingles and Mary Draper Ingles.
 John Preston McConnell Library. James Zoll Ingles Ferry Store Ledgers: [Finding Aid]. Radford, Va: McConnell Library Archives and Special Collections, 2011. Summary: This contains two ledgers and a few supporting documents from a store owned by James Zoll that was at or near the site of Ingles Ferry near Radford, and operated ca. 1850-1870s.
 Killen, Linda. Ingles Ferry Ledgers: 1840s to 1880s. [Virginia?]: [L. Killen], 1999. Notes: Includes index. Description: 96 pages; 28 cm. Responsibility: transcribed by Linda Killen.

References

National Register of Historic Places in Pulaski County, Virginia
1772 establishments in Virginia